The following is the complete filmography of American actor and comedian Tim Conway.

Film

Television

Video games

Video

References

External links
 

American filmographies
Male actor filmographies